Deoxynucleotidyltransferase terminal-interacting protein 2 is an enzyme that in humans is encoded by the DNTTIP2 gene.

Interactions
DNTTIP2 has been shown to interact with Estrogen receptor alpha.

References

Further reading